Arnell Horton (21 September 1892 – 15 September 1987) was an Australian cricketer. He played one first-class match for Tasmania in 1928/29.

See also
 List of Tasmanian representative cricketers

References

External links
 

1892 births
1987 deaths
Australian cricketers
Tasmania cricketers
Cricketers from Tasmania